Lize-Mari Retief (born 30 November 1986 in Bloemfontein, South Africa) is an Olympic and national-record-holding swimmer from South Africa. She swam for South Africa at the 2008 Olympics.

At the 2008 South African Nationals in April, she set 3 South African Records: 50 free, 50 fly and 100 fly.

She has swum for South Africa at the:
Olympics: 2008
Commonwealth Games: 2006
All-Africa Games: 2003

At the 2003 All-Africa Games, she won the most individual medals of any female swimmer: 5 golds and 1 silver.

References

Living people
1986 births
Sportspeople from Bloemfontein
Alumni of St Mary's School, Waverley
South African female swimmers
Olympic swimmers of South Africa
Swimmers at the 2008 Summer Olympics
Swimmers at the 2006 Commonwealth Games
Commonwealth Games bronze medallists for South Africa
Afrikaner people
Commonwealth Games medallists in swimming
African Games gold medalists for South Africa
African Games medalists in swimming
African Games silver medalists for South Africa
Competitors at the 2003 All-Africa Games
Medallists at the 2006 Commonwealth Games